Cutbank is an unincorporated hamlet in Loreburn Rural Municipality No. 254, Saskatchewan, Canada. The hamlet is located 40 km south east of the Town of Outlook east of highway 44 east of the Gardiner Dam & Danielson Provincial Park.

See also

List of communities in Saskatchewan
Hamlets of Saskatchewan

Loreburn No. 254, Saskatchewan
Unincorporated communities in Saskatchewan
Ghost towns in Saskatchewan